Marie-Chantal contre le docteur Kha, also known as Blue Panther, is a 1965 spy film directed by Claude Chabrol. based on the character in a series of novels by Jacques Chazot.

Plot
The French It girl Marie-Chantal gets accidentally entangled in a secret war between agents and terrorists. Before she actually realises what's going on around her, the henchmen of a certain Dr.Kha consider her a dangerous witness and try to hunt her down. On the run she gets to know an agent named Paco who works for Dr. Kha's counterpart Professor Lombardi.

Cast
Marie Laforêt as Marie-Chantal
Francisco Rabal as Paco Castillo
Serge Reggiani as Ivanov
Charles Denner as Johnson
Akim Tamiroff as Dr. Kha
Roger Hanin as Bruno Kerrien
Stéphane Audran as Olga
Pierre-François Moro as Hubert (as Pierre Moro)
Gilles Chusseau as Gregor
Antonio Passalia as Sparafucile / Gunshooter (as Anthony Pass)
Robert Burnier as Old Swissman
Claude Chabrol as Barman / Drugstore clerk

Reception
In "The Eurospy Guide" Matt Blake praises  the direction as well as the cinematography as "top-notch", the choreography as partly "hilarious"  and the music as "good".  He evaluates the sum of it all as "immensely entertaining".

Bibliography

References

External links
 

1965 films
1960s spy comedy films
French spy comedy films
Spanish spy comedy films
Italian spy comedy films
1960s French-language films
1965 comedy films
1960s French films
1960s Italian films
French-language Italian films